Michele Bardsley is the pen name of Michele Freeman (born Michele Renee Vail on January 21, 1970, in Tulsa, Oklahoma) who is an American writer of paranormal and contemporary romantic fiction. Bardsley is a New York Times and USA Today bestselling author and has published more than 40 novels, novellas, short stories, and articles since the publication of her first book in 1999. She has written young adult paranormal fiction under Michele Vail. She lives in Texas with her husband, four dogs, and two cats.

Biography
Bardsley received her first publishing contract in 1998 from pioneer electronic publisher, Hard Shell Word Factory, for her romantic comedy, Daddy In Training (out-of-print). She's had numerous short stories, novellas, and novels published by electronic, independent, and traditional publishers. Her novel, Because Your Vampire Said So (Signet Eclipse, 2008), received the 2008 RT Reviewer's Choice Award for Best Vampire Romance.

Over the years, her work has earned awards and recognition from many organizations and publications. A few include: “A Mother Scorned” won the Grand Prize in the 72nd Annual Writer’s Digest Writing Competition; Love Gone Wild (formerly published as Wild Women) received OWFI's coveted trophy award for Best Book of Fiction and FWA's Royal Palm Award for Best Romance Novel; and A Demon is a Girl’s Best Friend was awarded Crème de la Crème from the Oklahoma Writer's Federation, Inc. Bardsley's poetry, nonfiction, and short-short fiction have received awards and recognition from Northwoods Journal, Tulsa Community College, Byline Magazine, Scribe & Quill, Oklahoma State University, Amazing Instant Novelist, OWFI, Writer's Bloc, Writer's Digest, and WriteLink.

Selected works

Broken Heart Series 
 I'm The Vampire, That's Why (Signet Eclipse, 2006)
 Don't Talk Back To Your Vampire (Signet Eclipse, 2007)
 Because Your Vampire Said So (Signet Eclipse, 2008)
 Wait Till Your Vampire Gets Home (Signet Eclipse, 2008)
 Over My Dead Body (Signet Eclipse, 2009)
 Come Hell or High Water (Signet Eclipse, 2010)
 Cross Your Heart (Signet Eclipse, 2010)
 Must Love Lycans (Signet Eclipse, 2011)
 Only Lycans Need Apply (Signet Eclipse, 2013)
 Broken Heart Tails (Freeman Publications, 2014)
 Some Lycan Hot (Freeman Publications, 2015)
 You'll Understand When You're Dead (Freeman Publications, 2015)
 Lycan On the Edge (Freeman Publications, 2015)
 Your Lycan or Mine? (2017)

Broken Heart Holidays 
 Valentine's Day Sucks
 Harry Little, Leprechaun
 A Zombie for Christmas

The Pack Rules Series 
 The Werewolf's Bride
 The Werewolf Bodyguard
 Two Alphas and a Lady
 Bear Witness
 A Five Pack of Shifter Romances (Collection of Novellas)
 The Dragon's Wife
 Bear Winter

Deed Brothers Series 
 A Damned Deed
 A Christmas Deed
 A Dirty Deed

Wizards of Nevermore Series
 Never Again (Signet Eclipse, 2011)
 Never Say Never (Signet Eclipse, 2012)
 Never Say Die (Signet Eclipse, 2017)

Violetta Graves Series
 In Good Spirits
 A Spirited Defense
 Getting in the Spirit

Frisky Romance Series 
 Frisky Business
 Frisky Summer
 Frisky Threesome

Holiday Bites Series 
 Holiday Bites (Collection): Christmas for Eve, Candy for Valentine, and Treats for Trixie
 Fireworks for July

Wolves on the Prowl (Completed Series) 
 A Wild Ride
 Wild Threesome
 Blood Wild
 Wild Darkness
 Going Wild (Omnibus)

Single Titles 
 Heart of Magic
 Love Gone Wild

Short Stories 
 A Mother Scorned
 A Demon is a Girl's Best Friend
 Diana the Zombie

The Reaper Diaries (written as Michele Vail) 
 Undeadly
 Unchosen
 Unbroken

See also 
 List of Romance Novelists

References

External links
Michele Bardsley's Official Website
New York Times Bestseller List (Kiss of Christmas Anthology debuted at #12)
USA Today Bestseller List: (Kiss of Christmas Anthology #31 and #102 two weeks consecutively)

1970 births
Living people
Writers from Tulsa, Oklahoma
American women novelists
21st-century American women